UNIT: Dominion is a Big Finish Productions audio drama based on the long-running British science fiction television series Doctor Who. It is a special four-hour-long story in a five disc CD box set.

Plot
UNIT, and their current Scientific Adviser, Elizabeth Klein, are fending off a spate of unusual alien invasions.  Assisting her is a man she's never seen before, claiming to be the Doctor.

Cast
The Doctor – Sylvester McCoy
Klein – Tracey Childs
Raine Creevey – Beth Chalmers
The Other Doctor/The Master – Alex MacQueen
Colonel Lafayette – Julian Dutton
Sergeant Pete Wilson – Bradley Gardner
Sylvie / Liz Morrison – Miranda Keeling 
Private Phillips / John Starr – Ben Porter
Major Wyland-Jones – Sam Clemens
Private Maynard / Arunzell – Alex Mallinson
Ace – Sophie Aldred

Continuity
The Seventh Doctor first met Klein in the audio story Colditz.  She was a scientist from an alternate time line, a version of the 1960s where the Nazis had won World War II.  The Doctor erased that time line, but Klein became trapped in the primary time line.  Eventually, the Doctor discovered her again, in A Thousand Tiny Wings, and took her with him.  However, she stole the TARDIS and created multiple alternate time lines.  In The Architects of History, the Doctor, with help from the Time Lords, repaired the damaged course of time and erased Klein from history.  Afterward, he visited Klein – the version who was raised in the primary time line – who had no recollection of her alternate life or travels with the Doctor.  This new current version of Klein works at UNIT as their Scientific Advisor, a position previously held by the Third Doctor.
Klein says the German name Johann seemed very familiar.  This is a reference to the pseudonym an alternate version of the Eighth Doctor used to trick the original version of Klein. 
Raine travelled with the Seventh Doctor and Ace in the Lost Stories audios, starting with Crime of the Century.  The Doctor met her parents in the previous story, Thin Ice, where he helped deliver Raine.  UNIT: Dominion takes place a long time after those stories, from the Doctor's perspective, but for Raine, who has spent little time with him, this story takes place between Animal and Earth Aid.
Ace's voice is heard briefly, warning the Doctor from Gallifrey.  How or why she is there is not explained, however, the producers of the original television series planned to take her there as part of her departure story.  The intention was that the Doctor wanted her to be educated by the Time Lords, but that story was never told, due to the cancellation of the series in 1989.
The TARDIS found on the planet Tersurus was explained in the 1976 television story, The Deadly Assassin.  A Time Lord named Chancellor Goth discovered the Master there and returned him to Gallifrey where he battled the Fourth Doctor.
"The Omega business" and force field that Klein mentions is in regards to the 1973 story, The Three Doctors.
The Fourth Doctor gave Brigadier Lethbridge-Stewart a space-time telegraph, as revealed in the 1975 story, Terror of the Zygons.
In part one the Doctor refers to the events of The Tenth Planet and The Caves of Androzani.

References

2012 audio plays
Seventh Doctor audio plays
UNIT audio plays
Master
Audio plays by Nicholas Briggs